Johnstonville (formerly, Toadtown) is a census-designated place in Lassen County, California. Its population is 973 as of the 2020 census, down from 1,024 from the 2010 census.

The place was founded as Toadtown by settlers in 1857. The name reflected the abundance of toads at the place. A post office operated at Johnstonville from 1902 to 1943. The name honors Robert Johnston, who helped develop the town.

Geography

According to the United States Census Bureau, the CDP has a total area of 8.4 square miles (21.7 km), of which over 99% is land.

Climate
This region experiences warm (but not hot) and dry summers, with no average monthly temperatures above .  According to the Köppen Climate Classification system, Johnstonville has a warm-summer Mediterranean climate, abbreviated "Csb" on climate maps.

Demographics

The 2010 United States Census reported that Johnstonville had a population of 1,024. The racial makeup of Johnstonville was 929 (90.7%) White, 7 (0.7%) African American, 16 (1.6%) Native American, 13 (1.3%) Asian, 0 (0.0%) Pacific Islander, 26 (2.5%) from other races, and 33 (3.2%) from two or more races. Hispanic or Latino of any race were 73 persons (7.1%).

The Census reported that 1,024 people (100% of the population) lived in households, 0 (0%) lived in non-institutionalized group quarters, and 0 (0%) were institutionalized.

There were 370 households, out of which 138 (37.3%) had children under the age of 18 living in them, 235 (63.5%) were opposite-sex married couples living together, 29 (7.8%) had a female householder with no husband present, 18 (4.9%) had a male householder with no wife present.  There were 17 (4.6%) unmarried opposite-sex partnerships, and 1 (0.3%) same-sex married couples or partnerships. 67 households (18.1%) were made up of individuals, and 26 (7.0%) had someone living alone who was 65 years of age or older. The average household size was 2.77.  There were 282 families (76.2% of all households); the average family size was 3.12.

The population was spread out, with 290 people (28.3%) under the age of 18, 66 people (6.4%) aged 18 to 24, 231 people (22.6%) aged 25 to 44, 306 people (29.9%) aged 45 to 64, and 131 people (12.8%) who were 65 years of age or older.  The median age was 39.9 years. For every 100 females, there were 103.6 males.  For every 100 females age 18 and over, there were 96.8 males.

The homeowner vacancy rate was 1.0%; the rental vacancy rate was 1.2%.  743 people (72.6% of the population) lived in owner-occupied housing units and 281 people (27.4%) lived in rental housing units.

Politics

Notable residents
Nevada Barr, author

References

Census-designated places in Lassen County, California
Populated places established in 1857
Census-designated places in California
1857 establishments in California

es:Junction City (California)